Leif Reinhold Mannerström, (born 17 March 1940 in Stockholm) is a Swedish restaurateur. Between 1994 and 2010 he ran the restaurant Sjömagasinet in Gothenburg, he has been the judge of the cooking shows  Sveriges mästerkock and "Sveriges yngsta mästerkock" that are broadcast on TV4. Mannerström has run several restaurants like Golfrestaurangen in Hovås, Johanna and Kometen in Gothenburg, Aquarella at the Canary Islands, Belle Avenue in Gothenburg, Mannerström & Jansson and Steak.

Mannerström was a contestant on the cooking show Kockarnas kamp in 2012, he currently runs the restaurant Kometen at Vasagatan in Gothenburg.

References

External links 

Living people
1940 births
Businesspeople from Stockholm